The 2011 Bell Helicopter Armed Forces Bowl, the ninth edition of the game was a post-season American college football bowl game held on December 30, 2011, at Gerald J. Ford Stadium on the campus of SMU in University Park, Texas, as part of the 2011–12 NCAA Bowl season.

The game, telecasted at 11:00 a.m. CT on ESPN, featured Tulsa versus BYU.  BYU won the game by a score of 24–21.

This was the second and final year that the bowl was held at Gerald J. Ford Stadium. In 2012, the bowl returned to Amon G. Carter Stadium on the campus of TCU after the completion of a renovation of the stadium.

Teams

BYU

Tulsa

Scoring summary

Source:

References

2011–12 NCAA football bowl games
2011
2011
2011
December 2011 sports events in the United States
2011 in sports in Texas